Quchaq may refer to:
 Quchaq, Divandarreh
 Quchaq, Qorveh
 Quchaq, Saqqez